The Battle of Verona was fought between the Roman general and usurper Decius, and emperor Philip the Arab in 249. Decius was victorious and Philip and his son Philip II were both killed. Decius was subsequently declared Roman emperor.

Prelude

In late 248, Gothic tribes had attacked the Roman province of Moesia on the frontier of the Danube River. The Roman troops there, led by Roman general Pacatian, held the Goths back and temporarily secured the Roman defense of Moesia. That same year, Pacatian's troops proclaimed him emperor. Roman emperor Philip the Arab dispatched the supportive and outspoken senator Decius to Moesia to put down the rebellion. Decius brought his son Herennius Etruscus with him. However, before Decius arrived, Pacatian's troops mutinied and assassinated their commander. When Decius arrived, he and Herennius attempted to restore order to the usurper's army. The troops opposed the idea of being led by a distant emperor. Thus, they proclaimed Decius emperor. Decius and his army then marched to Italy. Phillip, with only two reserve legions, marched to meet Decius in battle.

Battle

The two armies met in battle near Verona, Italy, in a bloody and brutal battle. Decius was heavily outnumbered by Philip.

6th century Byzantine writer Zosimus recorded the day:

The supporters of Decius, though they knew that the enemy had greatly the advantage in numbers, still retained their confidence, trusting to the general skill and prudence of Decius in affairs.

Not many details of the battle are known, but Decius is known to have had a better quality of troops than Philip, and Philip's chances of victory were deemed improbable. Philip was slain by Decius, and his army was defeated.

Aftermath
Following his victory, Decius entered Rome and was received and hailed as emperor by the Senate, of which he had formerly been a prominent member.

References 

Verona 249
Verona 249
Verona
Verona 249
Verona 249
Verona 249
Verona
Decian dynasty